is a Japanese voice actor who currently works for 81 Produce.

Anime voice roles
Naruto - Kotetsu Hagane
Noir - Chu, Lune, and Vanel
Pokémon 4Ever - Houndoom
Rockman EXE - MagnetMan
Rockman EXE Axess - MagnetMan
Rockman EXE Stream - MagnetMan
Saiyuki - Akatsuki, Ascetic Egan, Demon 2 (ep 1), Green Demon, Immortal, and Meihou's Father
Saiyuki Reload - Thief (ep. 13)
Un-Go - Ittō Ono

Video games
Chaos Rings (The Agent)

Dubbing
Jay and Silent Bob Strike Back (Jason Biggs)

References

External links 
 Tomoyuki Kono at 81 Produce 
 
 

Japanese male voice actors
1971 births
Living people
Male voice actors from Tokyo
81 Produce voice actors